Jim Murphy (born 1967) is a British Labour Party politician.

Jim Murphy may also refer to:

 Jim Murphy (American football), American football player and coach
 Jim Murphy (author) (1947–2022), American author
 Jim Murphy (boxer) (1903–1987), Irish boxer
 Jim Murphy (footballer, born 1942), Scottish professional footballer
 Jim Murphy (footballer, born 1956), Scottish professional footballer
 Jim Murphy (hurler), Irish hurler
 Jim Murphy (Missouri politician) (born c. 1951), member of the Missouri House of Representatives
 Jim Murphy (skateboarder) (born 1965), American skateboarder and activist
 Jim Murphy (Texas politician) (born 1957), member of the Texas House of Representatives

See also
 Murphy (surname)
 Murphy (disambiguation)
 James Murphy (disambiguation)